Unna station is the main passenger station in the Westphalian city of Unna in the German state of North Rhine-Westphalia. The other stations in the city that are served by regular passenger services are Unna-Königsborn, Unna West, Massen, Lünern and Hemmerde.

History 

The station was opened in 1855 as part of the Dortmund–Soest railway built by the Bergisch-Märkische Railway Company (BME) and equipped with an impressive station building, which was sold for non-rail purposes in 2005.

In 1866, the BME opened the line from Unna to Hamm to connect with the Cologne-Minden trunk line. Later the line was extended from Unna to Hagen, making Unna station into a railway junction of regional importance.

Between 1899 and 1901 the Prussian state railways opened the Fröndenberg–Kamen railway to connect the three east-west lines in the area. The southern part connected with the line to Menden, which was opened in 1872; this line was extended in 1912 to Neuenrade as the Hönne Valley Railway. The northern part was opened later for freight in 1900 and a year later for passenger traffic. This route is now worked only as far as Unna-Königsborn, as line S 4 of the Rhine-Ruhr S-Bahn.

Between 1909 and 1950, the Unna-Kamen-Werne light railway also connected Unna station and Kamen station.

Connections  

Unna station is served by the Rhein-Münsterland-Express (RE 7, at 60-minute intervals), the Maas-Wupper-Express (RE 13, at 60-minute intervals), the Hönnetalbahn (RB 54, at 60-minute intervals), the Hellweg-Bahn (RB 59, at 30-minute intervals) and Rhine-Ruhr S-Bahn line S 4 (at 30-minute intervals). The station also serves as the central bus junction for the city.

References

Railway stations in North Rhine-Westphalia
Railway stations in Germany opened in 1855
1855 establishments in Prussia
Rhine-Ruhr S-Bahn stations
S4 (Rhine-Ruhr S-Bahn)
Buildings and structures in Unna (district)